Barinas Airport  is an airport serving Barinas, the capital of the Venezuelan state of Barinas.

The Runway 13 length includes a  displaced threshold.

The Barinas VOR-DME (Ident: BNS) and non-directional beacon (Ident: BNS) are located on the field.

Airlines and destinations

See also
Transport in Venezuela
List of airports in Venezuela

References

External links
OurAirports - Barinas
SkyVector - Barinas
OpenStreetMap - Barinas

Airports in Venezuela
Buildings and structures in Barinas (state)
Barinas, Venezuela